Poughkeepsie High School is the public high school (grades 9-12) in the city of Poughkeepsie, New York. It is categorized as an inner city school district as a result of the high percentage of students living in low-income households.  In the 2014-2015 school year, 73% of students were eligible for free or reduced-price lunch.  PHS did not meet the Adequate Yearly Progress (AYP) specified by the No Child Left Behind Act in 2011-12. Poughkeepsie High School is currently the only 9-12 school within the Poughkeepsie City School District.

In 2014-15, there were 1,137 students enrolled in the High School, with an average class size of 20.  The student:teacher ratio was approximately 13:1.  The attendance rate in the 2013-2014 school year was 93%, and the suspension rate in that same year was 22%.  30% of teachers have their master's degree plus 30 Hours or Doctorate.

Poughkeepsie High School also hosts a first-of-its-kind program with the Dutchess County Regional Chamber of Commerce. This program has staff from the Chamber of Commerce teaching alongside a PHS teacher in the classroom. Students are taught job and career skills as well as enhanced typing. Students in the class also have an opportunity to network with local business owners. The Chamber of Commerce and High School host monthly gatherings with students from the class in which they participate in bonding activities with the local business owners. This public-private partnership with the Dutchess County Regional Chamber of Commerce gives Poughkeepsie High School students access to a greater pool of resources and a chance for highly effective community outreach.

History

Poughkeepsie High School opened in 1857 on the second floor of an elementary school; the first graduating class was 1863. Classes were not held in 1865, but resumed in 1866 in rented space. A new building was opened in 1872.

Yet another new building was built on North Hamilton Street in 1914 to accommodate 1,200 pupils. By the early 1950s, the population was outgrowing this building as well, and another location was sought, this time on Forbus Street. the State Education Department endorsed this move while city officials wanted to build an addition to the North Hamilton Street building. The new building on Forbus Street was completed in 1956, and students walked from the old building to the new one to celebrate the opening. Additions to the building were approved in 2002 as part of $27 million approved by voters for additions to buildings in the district that year. In 1958, the old high school building was sold to the Catholic Archdiocese of New York for $250,000. The Archdiocese would use this building to open Our Lady of Lourdes High School in April of that year.

As part of the renovation approved by taxpayers in 2002, a new wing was added to the Forbus Street building. This wing is currently home to the science and math departments at the high school, as well as several computer labs. The addition of this wing created a small courtyard in the high school building, which was later turned into the Michelle Obama Victory Garden. This garden is managed by teachers and students at the high school and serves as an alternate route to get to classes.

Demographics (2014-15)
61% Black
11% White
25% Hispanic
2% Asian or Native Hawaiian/Other Pacific Islander

49% Male
51% Female

America's Choice School
Under former superintendent Dr. Laval Wilson, the High School began to operate as an America's Choice School.  The America's Choice program aims to improve the standings of schools deemed to be at-risk.  The program utilizes specific teaching methods as well as intensive teacher training regimens in order to attempt to improve student achievement, test scores, and graduation rates, as well as to reduce the number of discipline problems.

Advanced placement
The school offers Advanced Placement (AP) courses in the following subjects: 
 AP Biology
 AP Calculus AB
 AP English Literature
 AP Spanish Language
 AP English Language and Composition
 AP World History
 AP United States History
 AP Statistics
AP Computer Science A

Poughkeepsie High School also has an Air Force Junior Reserve Officer's Training Corps (AFJROTC) class, which was introduced at the end of the 2014-15 school year.

Athletics
Poughkeepsie High School's mascot is the Pioneer, and the school colors are blue and white. As a part of a $22.8 million district-wide construction project, Poughkeepsie High School opened a new athletic complex on September 14, 2012. The complex is home to a football field, baseball field, and a soccer field, all of which are artificial turf. It services the baseball, football, soccer, and softball teams. The current sports offered at PHS are as follows:

Baseball (Boys)
Basketball (Boys)
Cheerleading (Boys/Girls)
Crew (Boys/Girls)
Football (Boys)
Golf (Boys)
Soccer (Boys/Girls)
Softball (Girls)
Swimming (Boys/Girls)
Tennis (Boys/Girls)
Track, Indoor (Boys/Girls)
Track, Outdoor (Boys/Girls)
Volleyball (Girls)
Wrestling (Boys/Girls)

Notable Student Athletes:
Larry Bennerman
Tom Catanzaro
Nigel Davis
Jerome Elting
Khalil Sharp
EJ Johnson
Dino Larry
Malik Lewis
Joe Molinaro
D'Andre Smith
Monty Stickles

Time Warner Cable Scholar Athlete of the Week

As part of Time Warner Cable's Scholar Athlete of the Week program, several Poughkeepsie High School seniors who excel in both academics and athletics received a news spotlight segment through the local Time Warner Cable of the Hudson Valley affiliate. The news segments are approximately two minutes in length and feature the scholar athlete themself as well as usually featuring a coach or teacher that is influential to the scholar athlete. The following individuals from Poughkeepsie High School have received the title of Scholar Athlete of the Week:
Malik Lewis (2016 Graduate)
Rose Spuhler (2016 Graduate)
Jenna Salmonese (2016 Graduate)
Mark Weaver (2015 Graduate)

Extracurricular activities
There are many extracurricular activities accessible to students who attend the school.  Student clubs and activities include:

 Concert Band
 Gay/Straight Alliance
 Jazz Ensemble
 Multicutural Club
 Math Team
 Debate and Ethics bowl
 National Honor Society
 Orchestra
 Pioneer Post (School Newspaper)
 Science Olympiad
 Sister2Sister
 Brother2Brother
 Student Government
 Culture Shock (Drama)
 Wind Ensemble
 Yearbook

Relationship with Vassar College
As of 2008, Poughkeepsie High School graduates who are accepted to Vassar College receive a special financial aid package.  This Program eliminates loans for the PHS graduates attending Vassar and replaces them with scholarship funding.

Other information
Ancestry.com, which requires a paid subscription, has digitized copies of the PHS yearbook for 1921, 1922 and 1962.

Other high schools in the Poughkeepsie area
Arlington High School (LaGrange, New York)
Oakwood School
Our Lady of Lourdes High School
Poughkeepsie Day School
Spackenkill High School

References

External links
 Poughkeepsie City School District Homepage
America's Choice
Poughkeepsie High School on Facebook
New York State School Report Card

Public high schools in Dutchess County, New York